= Justin Muen Jin =

Canadian businessperson

- Born: 2006 (age 19–20); Vancouver, Canada
- Education: Babson College (dropped out)

Justin Muen Jin (born October 2006) is an Canadian businessperson who is the chief executive officer of Giggles, a social video application. He previously founded Mediababy, a media publisher.

== Early life and career ==
Jin was born in Vancouver. While in high school, he started a YouTube channel, eventually creating the media publisher Mediababy in 2022. With an initial focus on meme content, the publisher garnered more than 20 billion views by 2024.

In late 2025, Jin co-founded Giggles Platforms, raising ~CAD$1.7 million funding before its launch with investors from firms such as Bain Capital.
